Peter Smalley is an Australian-born author born in Melbourne in 1943, screenwriter and broadcaster who lives in the United Kingdom, who has written a series of naval thrillers featuring Captain William Rennie. His first Rennie adventure HMS Expedient was published by Century, an imprint of Random House in 2005. His screenwriting credits include Dead-End Drive In (1986), The Return of Captain Invincible (1984) and Chopper Squad (1978–1979).

Smalley was born in Melbourne and following a career in advertising he became a screenwriter, broadcaster, and novelist. Smalley is from a seafaring family, and lives in London. His wife, Clytie Jessop, died in 2017.

Bibliography
A WARM GUN  (1972)
HMS Expedient (2005)
Port Royal (2006)
Barbary Coast (2007)
The Hawk (2008)
The Gathering Storm (2009)
The Pursuit (2010)

Screenwriting
Dead-End Drive In (1986)
Emma's War (1986)
The Wild Duck (1984)
The Return of Captain Invincible (1984)
Chopper Squad (1978–1979)
Centre Play (1976)

References

External links
Peter Smalley at Fantasticfiction.com
Peter Smalley at Random House

Writers from Melbourne
Year of birth missing (living people)
Australian emigrants to England
Australian broadcasters
Australian screenwriters
John Llewellyn Rhys Prize winners
Living people